The 1899 New Zealand general election was held on 6 and 19 December in the European and Māori electorates, respectively, to elect 74 MPs to the 14th session of the New Zealand Parliament. The election was again won by the Liberal Party, and Richard Seddon remained Prime Minister.

1896 electoral redistribution
Since the 1890 electoral redistribution, the four main centres had electorates with three seats each.

The election
The 1899 election was held on Wednesday, 6 December in the general electorates, and on Tuesday, 19 December in the Māori electorates to elect a total of 74 MPs to the 14th Parliament. A total number of 373,744 (77.6%) voters turned out to vote. In three electorates there was only one candidate, and they were thus returned unopposed. Two of those were Liberal candidates: Richard Seddon in the  electorate, and John McKenzie in the  electorate. The third was an opposition representative, William Russell, who stood in the  electorate.

Two candidates died during the election campaign. A third, Henry Augustus Field, died two days after having been re-elected in the  electorate.

Results

Party totals

Votes summary

Electorate results
Seventy-four MPs were elected across sixty-two single-member, and four three-member electorates.
The table below show the results of the 1899 general election:

Key

|-
 |colspan=8 style="background-color:#FFDEAD" | General electorates
|-

|-
 | rowspan=3 | Auckland, City of 
 | style="background-color:;" |
 | style="text-align:center;" | Thomas Thompson
 | style="background-color:;" |
 | style="text-align:center;background-color:;" | William Joseph Napier
 | style="text-align:right;" | 1,440
 | rowspan=3 style="background-color:;" |
 | rowspan=3 style="text-align:center;" | James Job Holland
|-
 | style="background-color:;" |
 | style="text-align:center;" | James Job Holland
 | style="background-color:;" |
 | style="text-align:center;background-color:;" | William Crowther
 | style="text-align:right;" | 938
|-
 | style="background-color:;" |
 | style="text-align:center;" | William Crowther
 | style="background-color:;" |
 | style="text-align:center;background-color:;" | George Fowlds
 | style="text-align:right;" | 94
|-

|-
 | rowspan=3 | Christchurch, City of 
 | style="background-color:;" |
 | style="text-align:center;" | Charles Lewis
 | style="background-color:;" |
 | style="text-align:center;background-color:;" | William Whitehouse Collins
 | style="text-align:right;" | 1,760
 | rowspan=3 style="background-color:;" |
 | rowspan=3 style="text-align:center;" | Tommy Taylor
|-
 | style="background-color:;" |
 | style="text-align:center;" | George Smith
 | style="background-color:;" |
 | style="text-align:center;background-color:;" | Charles Lewis
 | style="text-align:right;" | 418
|-
 | style="background-color:;" |
 | style="text-align:center;" | Tommy Taylor
 | style="background-color:;" |
 | style="text-align:center;background-color:;" | Harry Ell
 | style="text-align:right;" | 221
|-

|-
 | rowspan=3 | Dunedin, City of 
 | style="background-color:;" |
 | style="text-align:center;" | Alexander Sligo
 | style="background-color:;" |
 | style="text-align:center;background-color:;" | John A. Millar
 | style="text-align:right;" | 2,319
 | rowspan=3 style="background-color:;" |
 | rowspan=3 style="text-align:center;" | Scobie Mackenzie
|-
 | style="background-color:;" |
 | style="text-align:center;" | John A. Millar
 | style="background-color:;" |
 | style="text-align:center;background-color:;" | James Arnold
 | style="text-align:right;" | 1,564
|-
 | style="background-color:;" |
 | style="text-align:center;" | Scobie Mackenzie
 | style="background-color:;" |
 | style="text-align:center;background-color:;" | Alfred Richard Barclay
 | style="text-align:right;" | 637
|-

|-
 | rowspan=3 | Wellington, City of 
 | style="background-color:;" |
 | colspan=3 style="text-align:center;background-color:;" | John Hutcheson
 | style="text-align:right;" | 1,116
 | rowspan=3 style="background-color:;" | 
 | rowspan=3 style="text-align:center;" | Kennedy Macdonald
|-
 | style="background-color:;" |
 | style="text-align:center;" | Robert Stout
 | style="background-color:;" |
 | style="text-align:center;background-color:;" | Arthur Atkinson
 | style="text-align:right;" | 383
|-
 | style="background-color:;" |
 | colspan=3 style="text-align:center;background-color:;" | George Fisher
 | style="text-align:right;" | 122
|-

|-
 |colspan=8 style="background-color:#FFDEAD" | Māori electorates
|-

|}
Table footnotes:

Notes

References